Locomotives of the London and North Western Railway. The London and North Western Railway (LNWR) Locomotive Department was headquartered at Crewe from 1862. The Crewe Works had been built in 1840–43 by the Grand Junction Railway (GJR).

Locomotives inherited from constituent companies 

The LNWR was formed in 1846 with the merger of the Grand Junction Railway, the London and Birmingham Railway (L&BR) and the Manchester and Birmingham Railway (M&BR).

The GJR and the Liverpool and Manchester Railway (LMR) initially had their workshops at Edge Hill. The London and Birmingham workshops were at Wolverton. The Grand Junction built a new works at Crewe Works which opened in 1843, while the Manchester and Birmingham's works was at Longsight.

While the GJR and M&BR locos were mainly by Robert Stephenson and Sharp Brothers, the L&B's were mostly "Bury" types – indeed Edward Bury was its locomotive superintendent. On the GJR, breakages of the inside-cylinder engines' crank axles led to the redesign of several with outside cylinders under locomotive superintendent Francis Trevithick. These later became known as the "Old Crewe" types.

After the creation of the LNWR in 1846, Crewe and Wolverton became headquarters of the Northern and Southern Divisions respectively, with Longsight as the headquarters of the North Eastern Division.

In 1922, the LNWR merged with the Lancashire and Yorkshire Railway (LYR) and the North London Railway (NLR) to form a larger company still called the LNWR.

See:
 Locomotives of the Lancashire and Yorkshire Railway
 Locomotives of the North London Railway

Locomotives under the LNWR 
The first Northern Division Locomotive Superintendent (at Crewe Works) was Francis Trevithick, son of Richard Trevithick, who continued to build the basic 2-2-2 and 2-4-0 designs. Alexander Allan was Works Manager at Crewe from 1843 to 1853.

 4-2-2 Cornwall (1847)

In 1857, the North Eastern Division locomotive department, with headquarters at Longsight, was absorbed into that of the Northern Division. Trevithick was dismissed and returned to Cornwall with an honorarium, and was replaced at Crewe by John Ramsbottom as Northern Division Superintendent. Ramsbottom began to standardise and modernise the locomotive stock, initially replacing the 2-4-0 goods engines with his "DX" 0-6-0, of which over 900 were built at Crewe from 1858 to 1872.

The first Southern Division Locomotive Superintendent was Edward Bury who had been in charge of the London and Birmingham Railway locomotive department at Wolverton since before that railway opened. He resigned in 1847 and later became General Manager of the Great Northern Railway. His successor at Wolverton was James McConnell who had previously worked for the Birmingham and Gloucester Railway at their Bromsgrove works. Among the classes built under his superintendence were the very successful 2-2-2 "Bloomers", developed from a Bury design, and the Wolverton Express Goods 0-6-0 class, built from 1854 to 1863. The Southern Division's trains were longer and heavier, and 0-6-0 locos had been introduced as early as 1845.

There were distinct differences between the Southern and Northern Division locomotive policies. Wolverton had been set up in 1838 for repair work only, the locomotives being purchased from outside firms, whereas Crewe, from its foundation in 1843, was a locomotive-building works. Only a dozen locomotives were built at Wolverton from 1845 to the end of 1854, but in the following year construction started in earnest, and another 154 were completed in 1855–1863. The Southern Division engines were bigger, heavier and more expensive than those of the Northern Division, and after a disagreement with the cost-conscious Chairman, Richard Moon, in 1862 McConnell was obliged to resign. The Southern and Northern locomotive departments were amalgamated, and John Ramsbottom became Locomotive Superintendent of the entire LNWR, his headquarters remaining at Crewe. Locomotive building and repairing were gradually run down at Wolverton, which became the LNWR's carriage works in 1865.

All LNWR locomotives were painted black from 1873; for many years the goods engines were plain black, but passenger engines were given red, white and blue-grey lining, and most goods engines were similarly lined from the 1890s. Before 1873 locomotives had been green with black lines, and this seems to have been the normal livery from London & Birmingham and Grand Junction times.

In the 1850s on the Southern Division, McConnell had some of his express engines painted green with more elaborate patterns of lining in various colours, and in 1861–62 a few Southern Division engines were painted a very dark plum-red. The widespread belief that McConnell's engines were painted vermilion is incorrect, despite its constant repetition.

John Ramsbottom (1857–1871)

Francis Webb (1871–1903)

George Whale (1903–1909)

Charles John Bowen Cooke (1909–1920) 
With a reasonably comprehensive fleet, Bowen Cooke arranged exchanges with other railways in 1909 and 1910 to assess the scope for improvements, among which was superheating.

H. P. M. Beames (1920–1922)

George Hughes (1922) 
In 1922, the LNWR merged with the Lancashire and Yorkshire Railway (L&YR) to form a larger company still called the LNWR. George Hughes, formerly CME of the L&YR became CME of the LNWR. A year later the enlarged company was grouped into the LMS, and Hughes became CME of the new railway.

Locomotives of the North London Railway 

In the early days, locomotives were bought from outside builders but, from 1863, they were built in the North London Railway's workshops at Bow, London.

William Adams (1854–1873) 
 4-4-0T (16" inside cylinders) built 1863-1865
 4-4-0T (17" inside cylinders) built 1865-1869
 4-4-0T (17" outside cylinders) built 1868-1876
 4-4-0T (17½" outside cylinders) built 1876-?

John C. Park (1873–1893) 
 0-6-0T (17" outside cylinders) built 1879-1905

Henry J. Pryce (1893–1908)

Influence on LMS policy 

Crewe's influence on the locomotives of the London, Midland and Scottish Railway was less than that of its great rival the Midland Railway. However, the LMS did produce an unsuccessful "Midlandised" version of the G class 0-8-0s, see LMS Class 7F 0-8-0.

Preservation 
Preserved L&NWR locomotives are:

A full-size working replica of an LNWR Bloomer Class locomotive was begun at Tyseley in 1986, was 90% completed by 1990, but has never been finished (2020).

Another full-size replica of the same type (but non-working) was built in Milton Keynes, and was exhibited outside the station there from 1991; it is now (2018) in Milton Keynes Museum.

A miniature one-sixth scale locomotive 'Orion' was built by G R S Darroch during his time at Crewe Works. It is based on the LNWR Alfred the Great Class and is the only surviving Crewe built Webb Compound.  (Completed circa 1910-12)  The locomotive is in the ownership of the Stephenson Locomotive Society and currently based at Shildon Locomotion Museum.

Preserved L&YR locomotives can be found on its own page.

References

Further reading

External links 

 LNWR Society glossary with a list of classes

London and North Western Railway
 
London and North Western Railway
London and North Western Railway locomotives
London and North Wester Railway